Howell Davis (ca. 1690 – 19 June 1719), also known as Hywel and/or Davies, was a Welsh pirate. His piratical career lasted just 11 months, from 11 July 1718 to 19 June 1719, when he was ambushed and killed. His ships were the Cadogan, Buck, Saint James, and Rover. Davis captured 15 known English and French ships.

A short career
Born in Milford Haven, Pembrokeshire, Wales, Davis started out in piracy on 11 July 1718 when the slave ship Cadogan, on which he was serving as a mate, was captured by the pirate Edward England. Deciding to join the pirates, Davis was given command of the Cadogan and set out for Brazil on 18 July 1718. However, his crew mutinied and sailed to Barbados instead. Here Davis was imprisoned on the charge of piracy, but was eventually released and sought shelter in the pirate den of New Providence in the Bahamas. With New Providence being cleaned out by Governor Woodes Rogers, Davis left on the sloop Buck and conspired with six other crew members, who included Thomas Anstis and Walter Kennedy, to take over the vessel off Martinique. Davis was elected captain and conducted raids from his base at Coxon's Hole.

Subsequently, he crossed the Atlantic to terrorize shipping in the Cape Verde Islands. One of the prizes he took there became the new flagship of Davis' pirate fleet, the 26-gun Saint James. He then formed a partnership with a French pirate  Olivier Levasseur, known as La Buse, and another pirate captain, Thomas Cocklyn, which lasted until they fell out in a drunken argument. Transferring to the 32-gun Rover, Davis sailed south and captured more rich prizes off the Gold Coast. One of his prisoners was fellow Welshman Bartholomew Roberts, who was destined to become even more famous as a pirate, as well as Thomas Sutton, who would sail alongside Roberts for his entire pirate career.

Trickery and Deception

A clever and charming man as he was, Davis pretended to be a legitimate privateer to deceive the commander of a Royal African Company slaving fort in Gambia. After capturing the commander at a welcoming dinner, Davis held him for ransom and gained 2,000 pounds in gold.

He once seized a more powerful French vessel by flying a black pirate flag from another large but lightly armed ship he had recently taken. The French ship quickly surrendered, thinking she was outgunned.

However, when he tried his pretence of being a Royal Navy pirate hunter in order to kidnap the governor of the Portuguese island of Príncipe, the governor saw through it. Davis was invited to call at the fort for a glass of wine. On the way there, the pirates were ambushed and Davis shot dead on 19 June 1719. Bartholomew Roberts was elected to succeed him and raided the island in retaliation later that night.

Character
Captain William Snelgrave, the master of the Bird, a vessel captured by the pirates in 1719, later wrote an account of his experience. His ship was taken by Thomas Cocklyn's men, who abused him. However, when informed of this, Davis protected Snelgrave and obviously made a favourable impression on him. Snelgrave concluded that Davis was a man "who (allowing for the Course of Life he had been unhappily engaged in) was a most generous humane Person".

In popular culture 
The legend of Howell Davis has inspired recent works of fiction such as The Noble Pirates by R. L. Jean.

Howell Davis makes a minor appearance in Ubisoft's 2013 game Assassin's Creed IV: Black Flag, where his ship is tracked by protagonist Edward Kenway, who is seeking Bartholomew Roberts. When Kenway arrives in Príncipe, he discovers Davis' shot corpse, and then makes a partnership with Roberts and kills the two corsairs responsible for Davis' death, John Cockram and Josiah Burgess. Later in the game, Roberts wears Howell's costume.

References

General
Breverton, Terry (2003) The book of Welsh pirates and buccaneers. Glyndwr Publishing. 
Pickering, David. "Pirates". CollinsGem. HarperCollins Publishers, New York, NY. pp 80–82. 2006.
Specific

External links
Pirate Encyclopedia: Howell Davis
Pirates: Life at sea: Maritime, sea & ships: Fact files

1690 births
1719 deaths
18th-century pirates
Welsh pirates
Mutineers
People captured by pirates
People from Milford Haven